The  was a limited express service which connected Tokyo Station and Shizuoka Station in Japan. The service was discontinued in March 2007 due to declining passenger numbers.

Stops

Trains stopped at the following stations:

 –  –  –  –  –  –  –  –  –  –  –  –  –

Rolling stock
 1955–1957: Locomotive-hauled
 1957–1958: JNR 80 series EMUs
 1958– March 1982: JNR 153 series EMUs
 1968–1996: JNR 165 series EMUs
 16 March 1996 – 17 March 2007: JR Central 373 series EMUs (as Wide View Tōkai)

History
The Tōkai service was first introduced by Japanese National Railways (JNR) on 20 July 1955 as a locomotive-hauled semi express train operating between Tokyo and Nagoya. The train was upgraded to "express" status from 5 March 1966. From 16 March 1996, the service was upgraded to become the limited express Wide View Tōkai using pairs of new 373 series 3-car EMU trainsets, with two return workings daily between Tokyo and Shizuoka.

References

Named passenger trains of Japan
Tōkaidō Main Line
Railway services introduced in 1955
Railway services discontinued in 2007